Solomon Philip Gans (26 February 1788 – 1 November 1843) was a German jurist who lived at Celle, Hanover. He was the author of Das Erbrecht des Napoleonischen, Gesetzbuches für Westphalen (Hanover, 1810), Über die Verarmung der Städte und-des Landmannes (Brunswick, 1831), and Entwurf einer Criminal-Processordnung (Göttingen, 1836). He also edited the Zeitschrift für die Civil-und Criminalrechtspflege im Königreich Hanover, of which only four numbers appeared.

Publications

References
 

1788 births
1843 deaths
18th-century German Jews
19th-century German Jews
19th-century German jurists
German legal scholars
Jurists from Hanover
People from the Electorate of Hanover